Enthorpe railway station was a station on the Selby to Driffield Line in the East Riding of Yorkshire, England. It opened on 1 May 1890 and closed on 20 September 1954.

The station is home to several restored goods wagons, which are used as holiday accommodation.

References

External links
 Enthorpe station on navigable 1947 O. S. map
 
 Enthorpe Station Holiday Accommodation

Disused railway stations in the East Riding of Yorkshire
Former North Eastern Railway (UK) stations
Railway stations in Great Britain opened in 1890
Railway stations in Great Britain closed in 1954